Davide Ghiotto (born 3 December 1993) is an Italian speed skater. He competed in the men's 5000 metres at the 2018 and 2022 Winter Olympics, and won the bronze medal in the 10 000 m in 2022. In March 2023 he became world champion on the 10000 m at the 2023 World Single Distances Speed Skating Championships in Heereveen.

References

External links
 

1993 births
Living people
Italian male speed skaters
Olympic speed skaters of Italy
Speed skaters at the 2018 Winter Olympics
Speed skaters at the 2022 Winter Olympics
Place of birth missing (living people)
Universiade gold medalists for Italy
Universiade medalists in speed skating
Competitors at the 2017 Winter Universiade
Medalists at the 2022 Winter Olympics
Olympic medalists in speed skating
Olympic bronze medalists for Italy
21st-century Italian people
World Single Distances Speed Skating Championships medalists